The Schell Leather Company (Schell Leather Goods or Schell Leather Goods Company or Schell Inc.) is a manufacturer of leather (originally), plastic, vinyl, nylon, and synthetic material goods originally based in Cincinnati, Ohio founded by Albert and Charles J. Schell from 1865 or 1870 (or at least 1901 or 1925) to at least 1985.

The factory building was at 1015 Race Street in 1929 and moved to a 2-story 100x100' building at 2965 Central Parkway from as early as 1931 (beginning construction by Parkway Construction Co. at a cost of about $70,000) or 1938 to at least 1959, and moved again sometime between 1959-62 to 242 West McMicken Avenue until at least 1967. The company relocated to St. Petersburg, Florida in 1980.

Charles Schell was connected with the company for about 35 years as general manager and operator and buyer of bag and case leather. In 1968, Stephen Hahn acquired the company from the Schell family and became president. Hahn expanded Schell's holdings by acquiring a Chicago plastic-case producer and relocated its manufacturing operations to St. Petersburg, Florida, where the company's annual sales doubled to about $6.5 million. The company also owns Action Leathercraft, Inc. in Commerce, California; subsidiaries include Allstate Custom Cases and Lords Business Cases.

Patents and trademarks
Charles J. Schell was an inventor who patented at least five devices:
 Brief case (1929, patent #D78901)
 Flat-opening case (1934, patent #1985521)
 Lock mechanism (1941, patent #2242550)
 Lock structure (1942, patent #2293363)
 Strap lock (1943, patent #2320014)

In 1947, "Emdee" was trademarked (which expired in 1988) by Schell Leather Goods Co., Inc.

Products

References

American companies established in 1865
Manufacturing companies established in 1865
Manufacturing companies based in Cincinnati
Companies based in St. Petersburg, Florida
Manufacturing companies based in Florida
Leather manufacturers
Plastics companies of the United States
Textile companies of the United States